The Golden Rod Stakes is an American Thoroughbred horse race held annually in late November at Churchill Downs in Louisville, Kentucky. A Grade II event open to two-year-old fillies, it is currently contested on dirt over a distance of  miles (8.5 furlongs). The namesake goldenrod is the official flower of the state of Kentucky,.

Historical notes 
The inaugural running of the Golden Rod Stakes took place on October 20, 1910. It was established as a selling race and won by Helen Barbee. Heavy favorite Danger Mark finished sixth in the seven-horse field. It would remain a selling race until 1919 when it became the Golden Rod Handicap. For that year only it was run at one mile (8 furlongs). The Edward R. Bradley filly Busy Signal ran away from 15 competitors and won by 12 lengths. The race remained a handicap event through 1927 when it was placed on hiatus. In 1962 it was revived as the Golden Rod Stakes.

Records 
Speed record:
 8.5 furlongs (11/16 miles): 1:43.08 Rachel Alexandra (2008)
 6 furlongs: 1:12.40, Edith W. (1913)
 7 furlongs: 1:23.60, Woozem (1966) & Levee Night (1970)

Most wins by a jockey:
 4 – Don Brumfield (1963, 1968, 1976, 1981)
 4 – Julien Leparoux (2007, 2010, 2015, 2017)
 Most wins by a trainer:
 5 – D. Wayne Lukas (1990, 1994, 1996, 1997, 2003)

Most wins by an owner:
 2 – Bwamazon Farm (1963, 1975)
 2 – Hickory Tree Stable (1974, 1976)
 2 – Claiborne Farm (1983, 2013)
 2 – Overbrook Farm (1990, 1996)
 2 – Naveed Chowhan (2004, 2012)
 2 – Coffeepot Stables (2016, 2018)

Winners

References

See also 
Road to the Kentucky Oaks

Churchill Downs horse races
Flat horse races for two-year-old fillies
Graded stakes races in the United States
Recurring sporting events established in 1910
1910 establishments in Kentucky